Chapinero Alto is a neighbourhood (barrio) in the locality of Chapinero in Bogotá, Colombia.

Limits 
North - calle 72
East - avenida circunvalar
West - carrera 7
South - calle 44

References 

Neighbourhoods of Bogotá